Enterocloster citroniae, formerly Clostridium citroniae is a bacterium from the genus Enterocloster. The type species was isolated from a human infection in California in the United States.

References

 

Bacteria described in 2007
Lachnospiraceae